The 2023 Nigerian Senate elections in Oyo State was held on 25 February 2023, to elect the 3 federal Senators from Oyo State, one from each of the state's three senatorial districts. The elections coincided with the 2023 presidential election, as well as other elections to the Senate and elections to the House of Representatives; with state elections being held two weeks later. Primaries were held between 4 April and 9 June 2022.

Background
In the previous Senate elections, only one of the three incumbent senators were returned as Abdulfatai Buhari (APC-North) was returned while Monsurat Sunmonu (ADC-Central) and Soji Akanbi (ADC-South) were unseated in the general election. Teslim Folarin (PDP) defeated Sunmonu with 33% of the vote while PDP challenger Mohammed Kola Balogun unseated Akanbi with 38%; in the North seat, Buhari was re-elected with 37%. These results were a part of the continuation of the state's competitiveness as the APC won most House of Representatives seats but the PDP won a majority in the state House of Assembly and the governorship in addition to Abubakar narrowly winning the state in the presidential election.

Overview

Summary

Oyo Central 

The Oyo Central Senatorial District covers the local government areas of Afijio, Akinyele, Atiba, Egbeda, Lagelu, Ogo Oluwa, Oluyole, Ona Ara, Oyo East, Oyo West, and Surulere. Incumbent Teslim Folarin (APC) was elected with 33.4% of the vote in 2019. In May 2022, Folarin announced that he would run for governor of Oyo State instead of seeking re-election.

General election

Results

Oyo North 

The Oyo North Senatorial District covers the local government areas of Atisbo, Irepo, Iseyin, Itesiwaju, Iwajowa, Kajola, Ogbomosho North, Ogbomosho South, Olorunsogo, Orelope, Ori Ire, Saki East, and Saki West. Incumbent Abdulfatai Buhari (APC), who was elected with 37.1% of the vote in 2019, is seeking re-election.

General election

Results

Oyo South 

The Oyo South Senatorial District covers the local government areas of Ibadan North, Ibadan North-East, Ibadan North-West, Ibadan South-East, Ibadan South-West, Ibarapa Central, Ibarapa East, Ibarapa North, and Ido. Incumbent Mohammed Kola Balogun (APC) was elected with 37.6% of the vote in 2019 as member of the PDP; he defected to the APC in May 2022. Balogun sought re-election but lost in the APC primary.

General election

Results

Notes

See also 
 2023 Nigerian Senate election
 2023 Nigerian elections
 2023 Oyo State elections

References 

Oyo State senatorial elections
2023 Oyo State elections
Oyo State Senate elections